William Bromley-Davenport (20 August 1821 – 15 June 1884), also known as Davenport and Davenport-Bromley, was an English Conservative politician who sat in the House of Commons from 1864 to 1884.

Biography
Bromley-Davenport was the son of Rev. Walter Davenport of Wootton Hall, Staffordshire (third son of Davies Davenport of Capesthorne Hall) and his first wife, Caroline Barbara Gooch, daughter of  Archdeacon Gooch. His father adopted the additional surname Bromley in 1822. As Davenport-Bromley, William was educated at Harrow School and Christ Church, Oxford. He was a Lieutenant Colonel of the Staffordshire Yeomanry Cavalry and a Deputy Lieutenant and J.P. for Warwickshire and Staffordshire.

In 1864 Davenport-Bromley was elected at a by-election as a Member of Parliament (MP) for North Warwickshire. In 1868 he changed his name by Royal Licence to Bromley-Davenport. He held the seat of North Warwickshire until his death at the age of 62 in 1884.

He collapsed and died of a heart attack while seeking to quell disturbances in Lichfield caused by members of his Staffordshire Yeomanry Cavalry. They were on a training week under his command but indulged in riotous behaviour, including storming the stage in a performance of Gilbert and Sullivan's Princess Ida and blackening the face on the statue of Samuel Johnson.

Family
Bromley-Davenport married Augusta Elizabeth Campbell, daughter of Walter Frederick Campbell of Islay in 1858. Their son William was a soldier and politician.

References

External links

1821 births
1884 deaths
Conservative Party (UK) MPs for English constituencies
UK MPs 1880–1885
UK MPs 1859–1865
UK MPs 1865–1868
UK MPs 1868–1874
UK MPs 1874–1880
People educated at Harrow School
Alumni of Christ Church, Oxford
Deputy Lieutenants of Staffordshire
Deputy Lieutenants of Warwickshire
Staffordshire Yeomanry officers
English justices of the peace